Viktoriya Leleka (born 7 March 1973) is a Ukrainian basketball player. She competed in the women's tournament at the 1996 Summer Olympics.

References

1973 births
Living people
Soviet women's basketball players
Ukrainian women's basketball players
Olympic basketball players of Ukraine
Basketball players at the 1996 Summer Olympics
Sportspeople from Dnipro